Franklin Pearce may refer to:

Franklin Pearce (1930s pitcher)
Franklin Pearce (1870s pitcher)

See also
Franklin Pierce (disambiguation)
Frank Pearce (disambiguation)